Peckoltia lujani is a species of catfish in the family Loricariidae. It is native to South America, where it occurs in the Orinoco and Meta River basins in Venezuela and Colombia. The species reaches 7.5 cm (3 inches) SL.

P. lujani was described in 2015 by Jonathan W. Armbruster (of Auburn University), David C. Werneke, and Milton Tan alongside two other species in the genus Peckoltia: P. greedoi and P. ephippiata. Its specific epithet honors Nathan K. Lujan, a former graduate student of Armbruster.

P. lujani is sometimes seen in the aquarium trade, where it is often referred to either as Lujan's pleco or by one of two associated L-numbers, which are L-127 and L-207. The species was known in the trade for quite some time prior to its official description, hence the presence of L-numbers associated with it.

References 

Ancistrini
Fish described in 2015
Fish of Venezuela
Fish of Colombia